Theodore Lemuel Jefferies (November 8, 1908 – January 2, 1985) was an American football player and coach. Jefferies was an alumnus of the Centenary College of Louisiana, which he graduated from in 1929, as president of the student body and as "candidate for a B.S. degree. He served as head coach at Wichita Falls High School from 1933 to 1943, taking the school to its first state championship in 1941. Jefferies later coached at Lamar University, at a time when the school was still a junior college. In 1947, he became head coach at Stephen F. Austin University in Nacogdoches, Texas.

Among his former players was later Houston Oilers and New Orleans Saints coach Bum Phillips and Texas A&M University coach R. C. Slocum. Slocum played for Jefferies at Stark High School in Orange, Texas. Mr. Ted, as he was called, came out of retirement to coach in Orange. In Slocum's senior season, 1962, Jefferies took Orange to the state semifinals.

Head coaching record

College

References

Additional sources

External links
 

1908 births
1985 deaths
Centenary Gentlemen football players
Lamar Cardinals football coaches
Stephen F. Austin Lumberjacks football coaches
High school football coaches in Texas
Junior college football coaches in the United States
People from Jacksonville, Texas